Gills Creek is a stream in Richland County, South Carolina which drains into the Congaree River. Gills Creek was settled primarily in the 1780s and since the 1960s the creek area has become highly urbanized as part of the region around Columbia, South Carolina. The watershed includes over 70 miles of streams and tributaries and has become significantly polluted with the urbanization.

Geography
Gills Creek is located entirely in what is currently metropolitan Columbia, South Carolina and empties into the Congaree River. The creek originates at a small spring-fed pond.

The mean streamflow is 77 cubic feet per second.

Watershed
The Gills Creek watershed includes over 70 miles and 47,000 acres of land made up of Gills Creek and a number of tributaries (including Jackson Creek and Little Jackson Creek, among others).  The watershed is considered "one of the largest impaired urban watersheds" in South Carolina. A 1999 United States Geological Survey report found high pesticide levels in Gills Creek which could be harmful to fish populations (although not above Environmental Protection Agency drinking standards) and fecal coliform levels that make the creek not "safe for swimming or other direct bodycontact
activities."

History
The creek was named after James Gill, a settler in the 1740s.  In the 1780s, Wade Hampton I and Thomas Taylor bought large tracts of land and set up plantations on the East and West sides of the Gills Creek. Part of Taylor's plantation would eventually become the city of Columbia with legislation passed in 1786. The area remained largely agricultural until the Gills Creek swamp was drained and Camp Jackson was founded in 1917. Additional drainage and damming followed and led to the incorporation of the city of Forest Acres in 1935. Urban development followed in the early 1960s and the area is now largely settled and there is little barren or agricultural land use.

From October 1–5, 2015, a large portion of South Carolina and southern North Carolina received over a foot of rain, and totals exceeded 20 inches across much of eastern South Carolina. Columbia (the capital) broke its all-time wettest 1-day, 2-day, and 3-day periods on record with Sunday, October 4 being the wettest day in the history of the city. This event was characterized as a 1000 year rainfall event. A Federal state of emergency was declared for South Carolina on October 3. Five dams in the Gills Creek Watershed breached: Pinetree Lake, Semmes Lake, Upper Rocky Ford Lake, Rocky Ford Lake, and Cary Lake. The extensive flooding has caused several deaths, displaced an unknown number of residents, washed out a number of roads and bridges, and caused a yet-to-be-determined amount of property damage.

Crossings
The following is a list of crossings of Gills Creek.  List may be incomplete.
Begins at the Congaree River

 Bluff Road
 Interstate 77
 Shop Road
 Garners Ferry Road
 Rosewood Drive
 Devine Street
 Fort Jackson Blvd
 Kilbourne Road
 Quail Lane
 Forest Drive
 Eastshore Road
 Boyden Arbor Road
 (2 Unknown Roads)
 Park Road
 6TH Division Road
 Percival Road
 Marsh Deer Way
 Interstate 20
 Gills Crossing Road

Advocacy groups
The Gills Creek Watershed Association is a partnership of citizens, government, organizations, and business dedicated to restoring and protecting the Gills Creek Watershed.

References

Geography of Columbia, South Carolina
Rivers of Richland County, South Carolina
Rivers of South Carolina
Tributaries of the Santee River